Lord Botetourt High School (LBHS) is a high school in Daleville, Virginia. It was built in 1958 and opened in the fall of 1959. LBHS is one of two high schools in Botetourt County, the other being James River High School in Buchanan.

The school is named for Norborne Berkeley, 4th Baron Botetourt, the governor of Virginia from 1768 to 1770. Athletic teams are known as the Cavaliers, and the school colors are scarlet and silver. As of 2019, LBHS had 69 faculty members serving 1,052 students in grades 9 through 12.

Notable alumni
Zack Kelly, baseball player

References

Public high schools in Virginia
Educational institutions established in 1959
Schools in Botetourt County, Virginia
1959 establishments in Virginia